Nissan Motor Corporation is a Japanese automobile company. Other uses include:

People
 Rosa Nissán (born 1939), Mexican writer

Geography
 Nissan (river), a river in southwestern Sweden
 Nissan Island, island in Papua New Guinea
 Nissan Rural LLG, administrative division in Papua New Guinea
 Nissan-lez-Enserune, a village near Béziers, France

Brands and enterprises
 Nissan Chemical Industries
 Nissan Computer, unaffiliated with the auto manufacturer but famous for a legal dispute over the Nissan.com domain name
 Nissan Group, Japanese business conglomerate, which includes:
 Nissan Diesel, truck and bus manufacturer
 Nissan Forklift, forklift manufacturer
 Nissan Marine, marine engine manufacturer 
 Nissan Life, a defunct insurance company
 Thermos Nissan, a line of vacuum flasks

Other uses
 Nissan, or Nisan, a month on the Hebrew calendar, Babylonian calendar and modern Arab April
 Nissan Pavilion, the former name of a large entertainment venue in Prince William County, Virginia, now known as Jiffy Lube Live